The Faroe Islands U-17 National Team represents the Faroe Islands at under-17 age level and is controlled by the Faroe Islands Football Association.

The team most recently took part in the 2017 UEFA Under-17 Championship qualifiers in 2017, qualifying to the Elite Round for the first time, and then qualifying to the 2017 UEFA European Under-17 Championship final tournament.

History in the UEFA European Under-17 Championship
Between 1982-2001 this was an under-16 championship.

2017 UEFA Under-17 Championship Qualifiers

Qualifying round

Group 3

Elite round

Group 8

Current squad
 The following players were called up for the 2023 UEFA European Under-17 Championship qualification matches.
 Match dates: 16, 19 and 22 November 2022
 Opposition: ,  and 
 Caps and goals correct as of: 8 August 2022, after the match against

See also
Faroe Islands men's national under-21 football team
Faroe Islands men's national under-19 football team
Faroe Islands women's national football team
Faroe Islands women's national under-17 football team

References 

European national under-17 association football teams
Faroe Islands national football team